Kod Rud-e Yek (also Romanized as Kod Rūd-e Yek; also known as Kod Rūd, Kodrūt, and Kūh-e Do Rūd) is a village in Anduhjerd Rural District, Shahdad District, Kerman County, Kerman Province, Iran. At the 2006 census, its population was 84, in 15 families.

References 

Populated places in Kerman County